The 145th district of the Texas House of Representatives contains parts of Houston. The current Representative is Christina Morales, who has represented the district since 2019.

References 

145